Kafshgiri (also Romanized as Kafshgīrī; also known as Sar Kalāteh-ye Kafshgīrī) is a village in Roshanabad Rural District, in the Central District of Gorgan County, Golestan Province, Iran. At the 2006 census, its population was 1,767, in 493 families.

References 

Populated places in Gorgan County